Jargalsaikhany Enkhbayar (born 31 July 1977) is a Mongolian international footballer. He made his first appearance for the Mongolia national football team in 2001.

References

1977 births
Mongolian footballers
Mongolia international footballers
Living people
Association football goalkeepers
Mongolian National Premier League players